For the Defense is a 1922 American silent mystery film produced by Famous Players-Lasky and distributed by Paramount Pictures. It is based on the 1919 Broadway play, For the Defense, by Elmer Rice. Ethel Clayton is the star of the film. Considered to be a lost film for decades, a print was discovered in the Netherlands by the EYE Film Institute Netherlands (or Nederlands Filmmuseum).

Cast
Ethel Clayton as Anne Woodstock
Vernon Steele as Christopher Armstrong
ZaSu Pitts as Jennie Dunn
Bertram Grassby as Dr. Joseph Kasimir
Mayme Kelso as Smith (credited as Maym Kelso)
Sylvia Ashton as Signora Bartoni
Mabel Van Buren as Cousin Selma

References

External links

1922 films
American silent feature films
American films based on plays
Paramount Pictures films
Films directed by Paul Powell (director)
1922 mystery films
American black-and-white films
1920s rediscovered films
American mystery films
Rediscovered American films
1920s American films
Silent mystery films
1920s English-language films